David Laurence Cliss (born 15 November 1939) is an English former professional footballer who played as an inside forward.

Career
Born in Enfield, Cliss played club football in England and Australia for Chelsea, Guildford City and St. George-Budapest.

References

1939 births
Living people
English footballers
Chelsea F.C. players
Guildford City F.C. players
English Football League players
Association football inside forwards
English expatriate footballers
English expatriate sportspeople in Australia
Expatriate soccer players in Australia